Albert Henry Robinson , also known as Albert H. Robinson and as A. H. Robinson (January 2, 1881 – September 7, 1956) was a Canadian landscape painter, an invited contributor to the first Group of Seven exhibition in 1920, as well as a founding member of the Beaver Hall Group in 1920 and the Canadian Group of Painters in 1933. He used the rolling rhythm of landscape parallel to the picture plane used by A.Y. Jackson, with whom he often painted on trips to Quebec, but endowed his work with unusual colours – corals, pinks, dark blue. He sought simplified, powerful form

Career 

Born in Hamilton, Ontario, Albert Henry Robinson's first studies were with John S. Gordon at the Hamilton Art School.  In 1903-04, he was in Paris, studying first at the Académie Julian under Bouguereau and Bashet then at the École des Beaux-Arts under Gabriel Ferrier, and also with artist, Thomas William Marshall.  About 1908 he began to paint the Quebec landscape and moved to Montreal.  In 1910 he met A.Y. Jackson and went with him the next year to France, visiting St. Malo and Carhaix in Brittany.  In 1911 he was elected an associate of the Royal Canadian Academy and that year was in Europe again, and in 1920 became an academician.

His career included serving in the war industry as inspector of munitions during World War I (1917–1919). He was commissioned by the Canadian War Memorials to paint the Vickers Shipbuilding plant in Montreal.

From about 1918 to 1933, Robinson painted on trips along the St. Lawrence River and in the Laurentians with Jackson, Clarence Gagnon, Edwin Holgate and Randolph Hewton. In 1921, he painted with Jackson at Cacouna where he made studies for Returning from Easter Mass. His work was gaining recognition abroad when he had to retire due to a heart attack. When he recovered from the heart attack, it was followed by arthritis. By 1936 he had ceased to paint.

His dealer was William R. Watson of Watson Art Galleries, then Walter Klinkhoff Gallery, Montreal and today, Alan Klinkhoff Gallery in Montreal and Toronto and Eric Klinkhoff Gallery in Montreal. In 1982, Jennifer Watson for the Kitchener-Waterloo Art Gallery curated a retrospective exhibition which travelled to seven other galleries, Albert H. Robinson: The Mature Years; in 1994, Walter Klinkhoff Gallery organized a retrospective with a catalogue.

His work is in the National Gallery of Canada, Ottawa; the Art Gallery of Ontario, Toronto; the Art Gallery of Hamilton; McMichael Canadian Art Collection, Kleinburg; Montreal Museum of Fine Arts and the Musée National d'Art Moderne, Paris, among others.

References

Bibliography 
The Art Gallery of Hamilton, the National Gallery of Canada (1955).  Albert H. Robinson: Retrospective Exhibition.  

1881 births
1956 deaths
Artists from Hamilton, Ontario
Canadian landscape painters
Members of the Royal Canadian Academy of Arts